The Estadio Coliseo Maya is a multi-use stadium located in Cancún, Quintana Roo. It is currently used mostly for American football matches. The stadium has a capacity of 5,000 people.

The stadium currently serves as the home field of the college football program for the Universidad Anáhuac Cancún, the Leones Anáhuac Cancún. It also hosted the Tiburones de Cancún for a single game in 2022.

References

External links

Sports venues in Quintana Roo
Coliseo Maya
Athletics (track and field) venues in Mexico
College American football venues in Mexico
Cancún